Amalda hinomotoensis is a species of sea snail, a marine gastropod mollusk in the family Ancillariidae, the olives.

References

 Tsuchida E. (2017). Family Olivellidae. pp. 995–997, in: T. Okutani (ed.), Marine Mollusks in Japan, ed. 2. 2 vols. Tokai University Press. 1375 pp.

hilgendorfi
Gastropods described in 1922